Vítězslav Hálek (also known as Vincenc Hálek; ; 5 April 1835 – 8 October 1874) was a Czech poet, writer, journalist, dramatist and theatre critic.

Life

Hálek was born in Dolínek, Austrian Empire, today part of Odolena Voda in the Czech Republic. In 1841–1842, he lived in Zálezlice.

After completing his studies at gymnasium in Prague Hálek refused to go on to study at seminary. He didn't finish his philosophical studies and instead decided to become a writer. Beginning in 1861, he worked as an editor in Národní listy, later helping publish newspapers and journals (Lumír, Květy or Zlatá Praha, which he founded). He worked as a journalist until his death in Prague in 1874. He died suddenly of pneumonia.

He is considered one of the most important representatives of the May School, along with Jan Neruda.

Style
In his time, his writing was very popular, in part due to his optimistic and relaxed writing style.

Notable works
 Večerní písně (Evening Songs), 1859
 V přírodě (In the Nature), 1872
Antonín Dvořák, Vítězslav Hálek: The Heirs of the White Mountain, Op. 30, B 134

See also
 Vítězslav Hálek Memorial, Prague

References

External links
 
 
 Czech info

1835 births
1874 deaths
People from Odolena Voda
People from the Kingdom of Bohemia
Czech poets
Czech male poets
19th-century Czech people
19th-century poets
19th-century male writers
Burials at Vyšehrad Cemetery